Cora maxima is a species of basidiolichen in the family Hygrophoraceae. Found in Bolivia, it was formally described as a new species in 2016 by Karina Wilk, Manuela Dal Forno, and Robert Lücking. The lichen is only known to occur in Bolivia, where it grows as an epiphyte in tropical mountainous rainforests.

References

maxima
Lichen species
Lichens described in 2016
Lichens of Bolivia
Taxa named by Robert Lücking
Basidiolichens